Tiina Raevaara (born March 5, 1979, in Kerava) is a Finnish writer, best known for her debut novel Eräänä päivänä tyhjä taivas (2008), and a collection of short stories En tunne sinua vierelläni (2010), for which she won the Runeberg Prize in 2011.

References 

1979 births
Living people
Finnish writers